Albin Lorentzon (born 7 January 1986) is a retired Swedish professional ice hockey player who currently serves as physical therapist to Linköping HC Dam of the Swedish Women's Hockey League (SDHL). Lorentzon played 165 regular season games with Linköping HC in the Swedish Hockey League (SHL) and appeared in 25 playoff games with the club. During his playing career, Lorentzon also played in the Norwegian GET-ligaen with IK Comet and in the HockeyAllsvenskan with HC Vita Hästen, AIK IF, Örebro HK, and VIK Vaesteras HK.

Though he went undrafted, Lorentzon was 151st on the NHL Central Scouting Bureau final rankings of European skaters eligible for the 2004 NHL Entry Draft.

Lorentzon began studying to become a physical therapist after retiring from hockey in 2016. He joined the Linköping HC medical team in the 2018–19 SHL season as a massage therapist. Following the completion of his studies in 2020, Lorentzon became the principal physical therapist to Linköping HC Dam.

References

External links

Player profile on SHL.se

1986 births
Living people
Swedish ice hockey defencemen
Linköping HC players
IK Comet players
Örebro HK players
VIK Västerås HK players
Sportspeople from Linköping
Sportspeople from Östergötland County